Clarence Smith may refer to:

Sportspeople
Clarence Smith (baseball), Negro leagues player, 1921–1933
Clarence Smith (soccer), American soccer player
 Pop-Boy Smith (Clarence Ossie Smith, 1892–1924), Major League Baseball pitcher
Clarence Smith (cricketer) (1902-1982), South African cricketer

Musicians
Sonny Rhodes (Clarence Smith, born 1940), blues singer and guitarist
Pinetop Smith (Clarence Smith, 1904–1929), jazz pianist

Others
Clarence Smith (politician) (1849–1941), British Member of Parliament for Kingston upon Hull East, 1892–1895
Clarence Herbert Smith (1865–1901), Australian agriculturalist, engineer, blacksmith and inventor
Clarence L. Smith (1894–1951), American architect
Clarence 13X (Clarence Smith, 1928–1969), founder of the Five Percent Nation
Clarence A. Smith, director of the Centers for Disease Control and Prevention

See also
William Gervase Clarence-Smith, British economic historian